Let Your Dim Light Shine is the seventh studio album by American rock band Soul Asylum, released June 6, 1995 on Columbia Records. Critically, it suffered in comparison to its predecessor, Grave Dancers Union, the band's breakout release. It includes the hit "Misery", which was parodied by "Weird Al" Yankovic as "Syndicated Inc." on his album Bad Hair Day.

This was the first Soul Asylum album with drummer Sterling Campbell, who had previously provided half of the drums on Grave Dancers Union.

The album's title comes from a lyric of the song "Promises Broken".

Reception 

AllMusic gave a mostly critical summary of Let Your Dim Light Shine, with Stephen Thomas Erlewine commenting that the music "isn't quite as impressive" compared to previous efforts, and moreover that this element is easily overlooked because of the "self-importance" of the lyrics.

Track listing
All songs written by David Pirner unless noted otherwise.
"Misery" – 4:24
"Shut Down" – 2:51
"To My Own Devices" – 2:59
"Hopes Up" – 3:45
"Promises Broken" (Dan Murphy, Marc Perlman) – 3:14
"Bittersweetheart" – 3:34
"String of Pearls" – 4:56
"Crawl" (Stephen Jordan, Pirner) – 4:00
"Caged Rat" – 3:03
"Eyes of a Child" – 3:35
"Just Like Anyone" – 2:47
"Tell Me When" (Pirner, David Samuels) – 3:42
"Nothing to Write Home About" – 3:14
"I Did My Best" – 3:46

For the Japanese release of Let Your Dim Light Shine, an additional track was added to the album. It was a cover of the Descendents song "Hope". Note that "Bittersweetheart" fades out at 3:17, but the guitar feedback remains, therefore "Bittersweetheart" quickly segues into "String of Pearls". The running time of both songs equals about 8 minutes and 30 seconds long.

Personnel 
Soul Asylum

Dave Pirner – lead vocals, rhythm guitar, keyboards, trumpet, producer
Dan Murphy – lead guitar, backing vocals, producer
Karl Mueller – bass guitar, producer
Sterling Campbell – drums, percussion, vocals, producer

Additional musicians

Trini Alvarado – backing vocals
John Devries – backing vocals
Joey Huffman – organ, piano, mellotron
Eric Pierson – guitar 
Jane Scarpantoni – cello
Dave Schramm – pedal steel guitar 
Tim Ray – piano, electric piano

Production

 John Siket – engineer
 Michael Stern -engineer (non credited)
Butch Vig – producer
Andy Wallace – mixer
Howie Weinberg – mastering

Charts

Weekly charts

Year-end charts

Singles

Certifications

References

Soul Asylum albums
1995 albums
Albums produced by Butch Vig